
Gmina Ciechanów is a rural gmina (administrative district) in Ciechanów County, Masovian Voivodeship, in east-central Poland. Its seat is the town of Ciechanów, although the town is not part of the territory of the gmina.

Villages
Gmina Ciechanów contains the villages and settlements of Baby, Baraki Chotumskie, Bardonki, Chotum, Chruszczewo, Gąski, Gołoty, Gorysze, Grędzice, Gumowo, Kanigówek, Kargoszyn, Kownaty Żędowe, Mieszki Wielkie, Mieszki-Atle, Mieszki-Bardony, Mieszki-Różki, Modełka, Modła, Niechodzin, Niestum, Nowa Wieś, Nużewko, Nużewo, Pęchcin, Pieńki Niechodzkie, Przążewo, Romanowo, Ropele, Rutki-Begny, Rutki-Borki, Rutki-Bronisze, Rutki-Głowice, Rutki-Krupy, Rutki-Marszewice, Rutki-Szczepanki, Rydzewo, Rykaczewo, Rzeczki, Ujazdówek, Ujazdowo, Wola Pawłowska and Wólka Rydzewska.

Neighbouring gminas
Gmina Ciechanów is bordered by the town of Ciechanów and by the gminas of Glinojeck, Gołymin-Ośrodek, Ojrzeń, Opinogóra Górna, Regimin, Sońsk and Strzegowo.

References

Polish official population figures 2006

Ciechanow
Ciechanów County